Danièle Sallenave (born 28 October 1940) is a French novelist and journalist.  In April 2011, she became a member of the Académie française. In 1980 Sallenave received the Prix Renaudot for her novel Les Portes de Gubbio.

Works
Un printemps froid: récits, P.O.L., 1983, 
Phantom life, Pantheon Books, 1989, 
À quoi sert la littérature ?, Editions Textuel, 1997, 
L'Amazone du grand Dieu, Bayard, 1997, 
Castor de guerre, Gallimard, 2008,

Critical works 
 Jacques Le Martinel (ed.), Danièle Sallenave: Visages d'une oeuvre, Angers University Press, 2000. 
 Bruno Thibault, Danièle Sallenave et le don des morts, Amsterdam/New York, Editions Rodopi, 2004.
 Bruno Thibault (ed.), Danièle Sallenave, Europe, January 2014 (in press)

References

External links

1940 births
Living people
People from Angers
École Normale Supérieure alumni
Members of the Académie Française
Prix Renaudot winners
French women writers
Roman Catholic writers
Grand prix Jean Giono recipients
Officiers of the Légion d'honneur
Knights of the Ordre national du Mérite
Commandeurs of the Ordre des Arts et des Lettres